In heraldry, an animal recursant, tergiant, or (rarely) tergant is depicted as having its back shown to the viewer, e.g., "An eagle volant recursant descendant in pale" is an eagle flying ("volant"-- as opposed to "displayed", "rousant", "combatant", or "addorsed") with its back towards the viewer ("recursant"-- as opposed to "affronté ") going downward ("descendant"-- as opposed to "ascendant", rising) "in pale"-- along the vertical axis, as opposed to "in bend" or "in chief" or "to dexter", etc.). The term is most often employed to describe an eagle in flight, but may also describe such animals as a crab, lobster, frog, lizard, scorpion, spider, turtle, or insect.  The use suggests application to animals (real or mythical) which have the power of flight or to any creature which is often viewed from above and has a directional travel (i.e., excludes most mollosks and all microscopic animals as well as all plants).

References

Heraldry